A puppet state, puppet régime, puppet government or dummy government, is a state that is de jure independent but de facto completely dependent upon an outside power and subject to its orders. Puppet states have nominal sovereignty, but a foreign power effectively exercises control through means such as financial interests, economic, or military support. By leaving a local government in existence the outside Powers evade all responsibility, while at the same time successfully paralyzing the Government they tolerate.

Puppet states are distinguished from allies, which choose their actions on their own or in accordance with treaties they voluntarily entered. Puppet states are forced into providing legal endorsement for actions already taken by a foreign power.

Characteristics 
A puppet state preserves the external paraphernalia of independence (such as a name, flag, anthem, constitution, law codes, motto and government), but in reality it is an organ of another state which creates,
sponsors or otherwise controls the government of the puppet state (the "puppet government"). International law does not recognize occupied puppet states as legitimate.

Puppet states can cease to be puppets through:

 the military defeat of the "master" state (as in Europe and Asia in 1945),
 absorption into the master state (as in the early Soviet Union), 
 revolution, notably occurring after withdrawal of foreign occupying forces (like Afghanistan in 1992), or
 achievement of independence through state-building methods (especially through de-colonisation).

Terminology 
The term is a metaphor which compares a state or government to a puppet controlled by a puppeteer using strings. The first recorded use of the term "puppet government" is from 1884, in reference to the Khedivate of Egypt.

In the Middle Ages vassal states existed which were based on delegation of rule of a country from a King to noble men of lower rank. Since the Peace of Westphalia of 1648 the concept of a nation came into existence where sovereignty was connected more to the people who inhabited the land than to the nobility who owned the land.

A similar concept mainly associated with pre-19th century political history is suzerainty, the control of the external affairs of one state by another.

Examples

19th century 

The Batavian Republic was established in the Netherlands under French revolutionary protection. In Eastern Europe, France established a Polish client state of the Duchy of Warsaw.

In Italy, republics were created in the late 18th and early 19th centuries with the assistance and encouragement of Napoleonic France (see also French client republics).

During 1836 U.S. citizens allowed to live in the Mexican state of Texas revolted against the Mexican government to establish a U.S.-backed Republic of Texas, a country that existed less than 10 years (from 14 May 1836, to 29 December 1845) before it was annexed to the United States of America.
However, in August 1837, Memucan Hunt, Jr., the Texan minister to the United States, submitted the first official annexation proposal to the Van Buren administration (the first American-led attempts to take over Mexican Texas by filibustering date back to 1819 and by separatist settlers since 1826).

In 1810 U.S. citizens living in Spanish territory declared the area from the Mississippi River to the present state of Florida to be an independent nation.  Known as the Republic of West Florida, it only lasted for 10 weeks.  Not desiring to cross American interests, the republic's government encouraged annexation by the U.S., which soon occurred. 

In 1896 Britain established a state in Zanzibar.

World War I 

 Kingdom of Poland (1916–1918) – The Central Powers' forces occupied Russian Congress Poland in 1915 and in 1916 the German Empire and Austria-Hungary created a Polish Monarchy to exploit the occupied territories in an easier way and mobilize the Poles against the Russians (see Polish Legions). In 1918 the state became independent and formed the backbone of the new internationally recognized Second Polish Republic.
 Kingdom of Lithuania (1918) – after Russia's defeat and the territorial cessions of the Treaty of Brest-Litovsk, the Germans established a Lithuanian kingdom. However it became an independent republic with Germany's defeat.
 Duchy of Courland and Semigallia (1918) – in 1915 the Imperial German forces occupied the Russian Courland Governorate and the Treaty of Brest-Litovsk ended the war in the east, so the local ethnic Baltic Germans established a Duchy under the German crown from that part of Ober Ost, with a common return of civil administration in favor of military. This state was very swiftly merged with the Baltic State Duchy, and German-occupied territories of Russian Empire in Livonia and Estonia, into a multi-ethnic United Baltic Duchy.
 Provisional National Government of the Southwestern Caucasus and  Provisional Government of Western Thrace were the provisional republics that were established by the Turkish minorities in Thrace and Caucasia, after the Ottoman Empire lost its lands in these regions. Both were the products of the Ottoman Intelligence agency, Teşkilat-ı Mahsusa, in terms of organisational structure and organisers, and they had remarkably common features.
 Donetsk-Krivoy Rog Republic － The state, remotely controlled by the Russian Soviet Republic, was founded by Stalin's close friend Artyom. But the DKRR was disliked by Lenin. The capital of the republic was soon overthrown by the Germans again, and after the Soviet Red Army regained control of the territory, the country was dissolved at Lenin's request.

Interbellum 
 Republic of Central Lithuania (1920–1922) dependent and fully incorporated by Second Polish Republic by 1922

Axis powers of World War II

Imperial Japan 

During Japan's imperial period, and particularly during the Pacific War (parts of which are considered the Pacific theatre of World War II), the Imperial Japanese regime established a number of dependent states.

Nominally sovereign states 

 Manchukuo (1932–1945), set up in Manchuria under the leadership of the last Chinese Emperor, Puyi.
 North Shanxi Autonomous Government (1937-1939), was formed in northern Shanxi with its capital at Datong on October 15, 1937. The state was then merged with South Chahar Autonomous Government as well as the Mongol United Autonomous Government into Menjiang.
 South Chahar Autonomous Government (1937-1939), was formed in South Chahar with its capital at Kalgan (modern day Zhangjiakou) on September 4, 1937. The state was merged with the North Shanxi Autonomous Government as well as the Mongol United Autonomous Government to create Mengjiang.
 Mongol Military Government (1936-1937) as well as Mongol United Autonomous Government (1937-1939) were established in Inner Mongolia as puppet states with local collaborators. This state formed the large basis of what was to become Mengjiang.
 Mengjiang, set up in Inner Mongolia on May 12, 1936, as the Mongol Military Government (蒙古軍政府) was renamed in October 1937 as the Mongol United Autonomous Government (蒙古聯盟自治政府). On September 1, 1939, the predominantly Han Chinese governments of South Chahar Autonomous Government and North Shanxi Autonomous Government were merged with the Mongol Autonomous Government, creating the new Mengjiang United Autonomous Government (蒙疆聯合自治政府). All of these were headed by De Wang.
 East Hebei Autonomous Council – a state in northeast China between 1935 and 1938.
 Great Way (Dadao) government (Shanghai 1937–1940) – A short-lived regime based in Shanghai. This provinsional government was established as a preliminary collaboration state as the Japanese took control of all of Shanghai and advanced towards Nanking. This was then merged with the Reformed Government of China as well as the Provisional Government of China into the Reorganised Nationalist Government of the Republic of China under the leadership of Chairmen Wang Jingwei.
 Reformed Government of the Republic of China – First regime established in Nanjing after the Battle of Nanjing. Later fused into the Provisional Government of China.
 Provisional Government of China (December 14, 1937 – March 30, 1940) – Incorporated into the Nanjing Nationalist Government on March 30, 1940.
 Reorganised Nationalist Government of the Republic of China (March 30, 1940 – 1945) – Established in Nanjing under the leadership of Wang Jingwei.
 State of Burma (Burma, 1942–1945) – Head of State: Ba Maw.
 Second Philippine Republic (1943–1945) – government headed by José P. Laurel as President.
 Provisional Government of Free India (1943–1945) - set up in Singapore in October 1943 by Subhas Chandra Bose and was in charge of Indian expatriates and military personnel in Japanese Southeast Asia. The government was established with prospective control of Indian territory to fall to the offensive to India. Of the territory of post-independence India, the government took charge of Kohima (after it fell to Japanese-INA offensive), parts of Manipur that fell to both the Japanese 15th Army as well as to the INA, and the Andaman and Nicobar Islands.
 Empire of Vietnam (Vietnamese: Đế quốc Việt Nam, Hán tự: 帝國越南) (March–August 1945) – Emperor Bảo Đại's regime with Trần Trọng Kim as prime minister after proclaiming independence from France.
 Kingdom of Cambodia (Cambodia, March–August 1945) – King Norodom Sihanouk's regime with Son Ngoc Thanh as Prime Minister after proclaiming independence from France.
 Kingdom of Laos – King Sisavang Vong's régime after proclaiming independence from France.

Nazi Germany and Fascist Italy 

Several European governments under the domination of Germany and Italy during World War II have been described as "puppet régimes". The formal means of control in occupied Europe varied greatly. These states fall into several categories.

Existing states in alliance with Germany and Italy 
 Hungarian Government of National Unity (1944–1945) – The pro-Nazi régime of Prime Minister Ferenc Szálasi supported by the Arrow Cross Party was a German puppet régime. Arrow Cross was a pro-German, anti-Semitic Fascist party. Szálasi was installed by the Germans after Hitler launched Operation Panzerfaust and had the Hungarian Regent, Admiral Miklós Horthy, removed and placed under house arrest. Horthy was forced to abdicate in favor of Szálasi. Szálasi fought on even after Budapest fell and Hungary was completely overrun.

Existing states under German or Italian rule 

 Albania under Nazi Germany (1943–1944) – The Kingdom of Albania was an Italian protectorate and puppet régime. Italy invaded Albania in 1939 and ended the rule of King Zog I. Zog was exiled and King Victor Emmanuel III of Italy added King of Albania to his titles. King Victor Emmanuel and Shefqet Bej Verlaci, Albanian Prime Minister and Head of State, controlled the Italian protectorate. Shefqet Bej Verlaci was replaced as Prime Minister and Head of State by Mustafa Merlika Kruja on 3 December 1941. The Germans occupied Albania when Italy quit the war in 1943 and Ibrahim Bej Biçaku, Mehdi Bej Frashëri, and Rexhep Bej Mitrovica became successive Prime Minister under the Nazis.
 Vichy France (1940–1942/4) – The Vichy French régime of Philippe Pétain had limited autonomy from 1940 to 1942, being heavily dependent on Germany. The Vichy government controlled many of France's colonies and the unoccupied part of France and enjoyed international recognition. In 1942, the Germans occupied the portion of France administered by the Vichy government in Case Anton and installed a new leadership under Pierre Laval, which ended much of the international legitimacy the government had.
 Monaco (1942–1944) – In 1943, the Italian army invaded and occupied Monaco, setting up a fascist administration. Shortly thereafter, following Mussolini's collapse in Italy, the German army occupied Monaco and began the deportation of the Jewish population. Among them was René Blum, founder of the Ballet de l'Opera, who died in a Nazi extermination camp.

New states formed to reflect national aspirations 
 Slovak Republic under the Slovak People's Party (1939–1945) – The Slovak Republic was a German client state. The Slovak People's Party was a clerofascist nationalist movement associated with the Roman Catholic Church. Monsignor Jozef Tiso became the president in a nominally independent Slovakia.
 Independent State of Croatia (1941–1945) – The Independent State of Croatia (Nezavisna Država Hrvatska or NDH) was a German and Italian puppet régime. On paper, the NDH was a kingdom under King Tomislav II (Aimone, Duke of Spoleto) of the House of Savoy, but Tomislav II was only a figurehead in Croatia who never exercised any real power, with Ante Pavelić being a somewhat independent leader ("poglavnik"), though staying obedient to Rome and Berlin.

States and governments under control of Germany and Italy 
 Hellenic State (1941–1944) – The Hellenic State administration of Georgios Tsolakoglou, Konstantinos Logothetopoulos and Ioannis Rallis was a "collaborationist" puppet government during the Axis occupation of Greece. Germany, Italy and Bulgaria occupied different portions of Greece at different times during these régimes.
 Government of National Salvation (1941–1944) – The government of General Milan Nedić and sometimes known as Nedić's Serbia was a German puppet régime operating in the Territory of the Military Commander in Serbia during the Axis occupation of Serbia.
 Lokot Republic, Russia (1941–1943) – The Lokot Republic under Konstantin Voskoboinik and Bronislaw Kaminski was a semi-autonomous region in Nazi-occupied Russia under a collaborationist  administration. The republic covered the area of several raions of Oryol and Kursk Oblasts. It was directly associated with the "Russian Liberation People's Army" (Russkaya Osvoboditelnaya Narodnaya Armiya or RONA), known as the Kaminski Brigade.
 Belarusian Central Rada (1943–1944) – The Belarusian Central Council (Biełaruskaja Centralnaja Rada) was nominally the government of Belarus from 1943 to 1944. It was a collaborationist government established by Nazi Germany (see Reichskommissariat Ostland).
 Quisling's Norwegian National government (1942–1945) – The occupation of Norway by Nazi Germany started with all authority held by German Reich Commissioner (Reichskommissar) Josef Terboven, who exercised this through the Reichskommissariat Norwegen. The Norwegian pro-German fascist Vidkun Quisling had attempted a coup d'état against the Norwegian government during the German invasion on 9 April 1940, but he was not appointed by the Germans to head another native government until 1 February 1942.
 Independent State of Croatia (1941–1945) – Formed after the invasion of Yugoslavia, the Independent State of Croatia was led by the Croatian fascist leader Ante Pavelić. It controlled all or most of Croatia, Bosnia and Herzegovina, parts of Serbia, and parts of Slovenia. The government relied on German support for much of its existence.
Zuyev Republic (1941–1944) was an autonomous region in Nazi-occupied Belarus.

Italian Social Republic 
 Italian Social Republic (1943–1945, known also as the Republic of Salò) – General Pietro Badoglio and King Victor Emmanuel III withdrew Italy from the Axis Powers and moved the government to Southern Italy, already conquered by the Allies. In response, the Germans occupied Northern Italy and founded the Italian Social Republic (Repubblica Sociale Italiana or RSI) with Italian dictator Benito Mussolini as its "Head of State" and "Minister of Foreign Affairs". While the RSI government had some trappings of an independent state, it was completely dependent both economically and politically on Germany.

United Kingdom during and after World War II 

The Axis demand for oil and the concern of the Allies that Germany would look to the oil-rich Middle East for a solution, caused the invasion of Iraq by the United Kingdom and the invasion of Iran by the United Kingdom and the Soviet Union. Pro-Axis governments in both Iraq and Iran were removed and replaced with Allied-dominated governments.

 Kingdom of Iraq (1941–1947) – Iraq was important to the United Kingdom because of its position on the route to India. Iraq also could provide strategic oil reserves. But, due to the UK's weakness early in the war, Iraq backed away from the pre-war Anglo-Iraqi Alliance. On 1 April 1941, the Hashemite monarchy in Iraq was overthrown and there was a pro-German coup d'état under Rashid Ali. The Rashid Ali regime began negotiations with the Axis powers and military aid was quickly sent to Mosul via Vichy French-controlled Syria. The Germans provided a squadron of twin engine fighters and a squadron of medium bombers. The Italians provided a squadron of biplane fighters. In mid-April 1941, a brigade of the 10th Indian Infantry Division landed at Basra (Operation Sabine). On 30 April, British forces at RAF Habbaniya were besieged by a numerically inferior Iraqi force. On 2 May, the British launched pre-emptive airstrikes against the Iraqis and the Anglo-Iraqi War began. By the end of May, the siege of RAF Habbaniya was lifted, Falluja was taken, Baghdad was surrounded by British forces, and the pro-German government of Rashid Ali collapsed. Rashid Ali and his supporters fled the country. The Hashemite monarchy (King Faisal II and Prime Minister Nuri al-Said) was restored, and declared war on the Axis powers in January 1942. British and Commonwealth forces remained in Iraq until 26 October 1947.
 Imperial State of Iran (1941–1943) – German workers in Iran caused the United Kingdom and the Soviet Union to question Iran's neutrality. In addition, Iran's geographical position was important to the Allies. So, in August 1941, the Anglo-Soviet invasion of Iran (Operation Countenance) was launched. In September 1941, Reza Shah Pahlavi was forced to abdicate his throne and went into exile. He was replaced by his son Mohammad Reza Pahlavi. Mohammad Reza Pahlavi was willing to declare war on the Axis powers. By January 1942, the UK and the Soviet Union agreed to end their occupation of Iran six months after the end of the war.

Union of Soviet Socialist Republics

 Tuvan People's Republic, also Tannu Tuva (1921–1944) achieved independence from China by means of local nationalist revolutions only to come under the domination of the Soviet Union in the 1920s. In 1944, Tannu Tuva was absorbed into the Soviet Union.
 Finnish Democratic Republic (1939–1940) – The Finnish Democratic Republic (Suomen Kansanvaltainen Tasavalta) was a short-lived republic in the parts of Finland that were occupied by the Soviet Union during the Winter War. The Finnish Democratic Republic was also known as the "Terijoki Government" (Terijoen hallitus) because Terijoki was the first town captured by the Soviets.
 Azerbaijan People's Government (1940–1946) – A short-lived state in Iranian Azerbaijan after WWII.
 Latvian Soviet Socialist Republic (1940) – In June 1940 the Republic of Latvia was occupied by the USSR and in July a government proclaimed Soviet power, In August 1940, Latvia was illegally annexed by the USSR.
 Lithuanian Soviet Socialist Republic (1940) – In June 1940 the Republic of Lithuania was occupied by the USSR and in July a government proclaimed Soviet power, In August 1940, Lithuania was illegally annexed by the USSR.
 Estonian Soviet Socialist Republic (1940) – In June 1940 the Republic of Estonia was occupied by the USSR and in July a government proclaimed Soviet power. In August 1940, Estonia was illegally annexed by the USSR.
 Polish People's Republic (1947–1989) – The war-time governments under the Polish Committee of National Liberation, the Provisional Government of the Republic of Poland, and the Provisional Government of National Unity.
 National-communist state of Romania (1947–1968) – The war-time National Front (FND) government under Prime Minister of Romania Petru Groza. The FND was led by the Romanian Communist Party (PCR). Romania refused to participate at the 1968 invasion of Czechoslovakia and, since that year, it started trading and having a warmer relationship with the Western World, resulting in the Soviet Union to lose control of Romania as a puppet state. This is known as the de-satellization of Communist Romania.
 Czechoslovak Socialist Republic (1948–1990) – The war-time pro-Communist government National Front.
 People's Republic of Bulgaria (1946–1990) – The war-time pro-Communist Fatherland Front government headed by Kimon Georgiev (Zveno).
 Hungarian People's Republic (1949–1989) – The war-time government of Prime Minister Béla Miklós.
 Republic of Mahabad (22 January 1946 – 15 January 1947), officially known as the Republic of Kurdistan and established in several provinces of northwestern Iran, or what is known as Iranian Kurdistan, was a short-lived republic that sought Kurdish autonomy within the limits of the Iranian state. Iran re-took control in December and the leaders of the state were executed in March 1947 in Mahabad.
 Democratic Republic of Afghanistan (1978–1991)

As Soviet forces prevailed over the German Army on the Eastern Front during the Second World War, the Soviet Union supported the creation of communist governments throughout Eastern Europe. Specifically, the People's Republics in Poland, Romania, Czechoslovakia, Bulgaria, Hungary, and Albania were dominated by the Soviet Union. While all of these People's Republics did not "officially" take power until after World War II ended, they all have roots in pro-Communist war-time governments.

The Soviet Union established puppet communist governments in East Germany, Albania, Poland, Czechoslovakia, Romania, Hungary, and Bulgaria. Yugoslavia was also a communist state closely linked to the Soviet Union, but Yugoslavia retained autonomy in its own lines. After the Tito–Stalin split in 1948, the relationship between the two countries deteriorated significantly. Yugoslavia was expelled from the international organizations of the Eastern Bloc. After Stalin's death and a period of de-Stalinization by Khrushchev, peace was restored, but the relationship between the two countries was never completely mended. Yugoslavia continued to pursue independent policies and became the founding member of the Non-Aligned Movement. The Soviet Union continued to espouse its influence over China before the Sino-Soviet split in 1961. Some other countries which once were Soviet puppet governments include Mongolia, North Korea, DRV (SRV), Cuba, all of which had substantial dependence on Soviet economy, military, science and technology. After the dissolution of the Soviet Union in 1991, most of its former satellites were reformed towards democratization. Only China, Cuba, Laos and Vietnam remain one-party communist states. In 1992, all references to Marxism–Leninism in the constitution of North Korea were dropped by the Supreme People's Assembly and replaced with Juche. In 2009, the constitution was quietly amended so that not only did it remove all Marxist–Leninist references present in the first draft, but it also dropped all references to communism.

Decolonization
In some cases, the process of decolonization has been managed by the decolonizing power to create a neo-colony, that is a nominally independent state whose economy and politics permits continued foreign domination. Neo-colonies are not normally considered puppet states.

Dutch East Indies 
The Netherlands formed several puppet states in the former Dutch East Indies as part of the effort to quell the Indonesian National Revolutionː
 East Indonesia
 East Java
 East Sumatra
 Madura
 Pasundan
 South Sumatra
 Bandjar
 Bangka Island
 Biliton
 Central Java
 East Kalimantan
 Great Dayak
 Southeast Borneo Federation
 West Kalimantan

Congo crisis 
Following Belgian Congo's independence as the Congo-Leopoldville in 1960, Belgian interests supported the short-lived breakaway state of Katanga (1960–1963).

East Timor 
Indonesia established a Provisional Government of East Timor following its invasion of East Timor in December 1975.

South Africa's Bantustans 

During the 1970s and 1980s, four ethnic bantustans, called "homelands" by the government of the time (some of which were extremely fragmented), were carved out of South Africa and given nominal sovereignty. Mostly Xhosa people resided in the Ciskei and Transkei, Tswana people in Bophuthatswana and Venda people in the Venda Republic.

The principal purpose of these states was to remove the Xhosa, Tswana and Venda peoples from South African citizenship (and so to provide grounds for denying them democratic rights). All four bantustans were reincorporated into a democratic South Africa on 27 April 1994.

The South African authorities established 10 bantustans in South West Africa (present-day Namibia), then illegally occupied by South Africa, in the late 1960s and early 1970s in accordance with the Odendaal Commission, three of which were granted self-rule. These bantustans were replaced with separate ethnicity based governments in 1980.

Post-Cold War

United States supported governments in Afghanistan and Iraq 
The United States had many puppet states including the Islamic Republic of Afghanistan as well as the Iraqi Interim Government which both were military occupied by the United States.  The US also military occupied parts of Latin America during the Banana Wars and installed puppet regimes in Cuba, the Dominican Republic, Haiti, and Mexico.

Republic of Kuwait 
The Republic of Kuwait was a short-lived pro-Iraqi state in the Persian Gulf that only existed three weeks before it was annexed by Iraq in 1990.

Republic of Serbian Krajina 
The Republic of Serbian Krajina was a self proclaimed and by Serbian forces ethnic cleansed territory during the Croatian War (1991–95). It was not recognized internationally. That regime was completely dependent to the Serbian regime of Slobodan Milošević.

Donetsk People's Republic and Luhansk People's Republic 
The Donetsk People's Republic and the Luhansk People's Republic were two self proclaimed republics in eastern Ukraine considered to be puppet states supported by Russia. Russia annexed the DPR and the LPR on 30 September 2022, following the 2022 Russian invasion of Ukraine.

Current

Armenia
  - A self-declared independent state heavily populated by Armenians, it is internationally recognized as part of Azerbaijan.  Russian peacekeepers control the Lachin corridor that allows traffic to reach Armenia, on which it is heavily dependent.

China
  – The de facto independent Wa State in Myanmar is considered a puppet state that is linked with China.

Russia

  is considered a puppet state that depends on Russia. The economy of Abkhazia is heavily integrated with Russia and uses the Russian ruble as its currency. About half of Abkhazia's state budget is financed with aid money from Russia. Most Abkhazians have Russian passports. Russia maintains a 3,500-strong force in Abkhazia with its headquarters in Gudauta, a former Soviet military base on the Black Sea coast. The borders of the Republic of Abkhazia are being protected by the Russian border guards.
  has declared independence but its ability to maintain independence is solely based on Russian troops deployed on its territory. As South Ossetia is landlocked between Russia and Georgia, from which it seceded, it has to rely on Russia for economic and logistical support, as its entire exports and imports and air and road traffic is only between Russia. Former President of South Ossetia Eduard Kokoity claimed he would like South Ossetia eventually to become a part of the Russian Federation through reunification with North Ossetia.

By limited opinion

Iran

  – The Houthi government are considered by some to be a puppet state which is supported by Iran. This classification is disputed, however.

Saudi Arabia 
 – The Alimi government is sometimes considered a puppet state which is supported by Saudi Arabia.

United Arab Emirates
 – Southern Transitional Council is sometimes considered a puppet state which is supported by the United Arab Emirates.

Turkey 

  – According to the European Court of Human Rights, the Republic of Cyprus remains the sole legitimate government in Cyprus, and the Turkish Republic of Northern Cyprus should be considered as a puppet state under Turkish effective control. Its isolation, the Turkish military presence and the heavy dependence on Turkish support mean that Turkey has a high level of control over the country's decision-making processes. That has led to some experts stating that it runs as an effective puppet state of Turkey. Other experts, however, have pointed out to the independent nature of elections and appointments in Northern Cyprus and disputes between the Turkish Cypriot and Turkish governments and conclude that "puppet state" is not an accurate description for Northern Cyprus.

Russia
  is sometimes considered a puppet state supported by Russia.
  has been occasionally described as a Russian puppet state or de facto Russian since 2022, following the crushing of the 2020–2021 Belarusian protests with Russian assistance.

See also

References

Further reading 
 James Crawford. The creation of states in international law (1979)

Political metaphors
Client state